The Cornish Crabber 17, or just Cornish Crabber, is a British trailerable sailboat that was designed by Roger Dongray as a daysailer and pocket cruiser and first built in 1989.

Production
The design was built by Cornish Crabbers in Wadebridge, Cornwall, United Kingdom starting in 1989, but it is now out of production.

Design
The Cornish Crabber 17 is a recreational sailboat, built predominantly of fibreglass, with wood trim. It is a gaff riged sloop, with a bowsprit, with a plumb stem, a slightly angled transom, a transom-hung rudder controlled by a tiller and a centreboard. It displaces  and carries  of ballast.

The boat is normally fitted with a small  outboard motor for docking and manoeuvring, mounted in a transom well.

The design has sleeping accommodation for two people, with two straight settees in the main cabin and an aft cabin with a double berth on the port side. There are no galley provisions. The optional head is a portable type. Cabin headroom is  under the fold-down dodger, which includes a zip-up back panel to enclose the below-decks area.

For downwind sailing the design may be equipped with a spinnaker.

Operational history
The boat is supported by an active class club, the Cornish Crabbers Club.

In a 2001 review naval architect Robert Perry wrote, "while these boats are attractive, it is difficult to do them justice in a review ... The 17 is a gaff-rigged sloop. Cornish Crabber owners seem to favor tanbark sails. I favor white sails. A small spinnaker is shown. The SA/D is a surprising 22.2. This should move the little hooker along quite well. Draft with the flat plate centerboard down is 4 feet; board-up draft is 1 foot, 7 inches. There is 217 pounds of ballast in the bilge. This is an ideal trailerable boat for a sailor looking for something a little different and is guaranteed to turn heads."

In a 2010 review Steve Henkel wrote, "the Crabber is part of a line of traditional West Cornwall (Eng-
land) watercraft recreated in fiberglass and elegantly finished. She's intended mainly as a daysailer but has camping space for two overnight under the fold-down 'spray hood' (dodger) with a zip-in back panel. Best features: Workmanship is outstanding for a boat this size. Foam flotation gives positive buoyancy. Intelligent organization of the very limited space includes a place for a portable head as well as basic overnighting gear (sleeping bags, camp stove, etc). Position of the outboard, in a well amidships and forward of the rudder, provides good steering control in both forward and reverse, and the engine can be removed and stowed in a locker meant for the purpose to eliminate prop drag. With her gaff rig and tan-bark sails, she's pretty as a picture underway. Worst features: Spars are varnished wood, beautiful to look at but a time-consuming maintenance chore. Price of both new and used boats, well above her comp[etitor]s, may not fit everyone's budget ..."

See also
List of sailing boat types

References

1980s sailboat type designs
Sailing yachts
Trailer sailers
Sailboat types built by Cornish Crabbers
Sailboat type designs by Roger Dongray